The monotonous lark (Mirafra passerina) is a species of lark in the family Alaudidae found in southern Africa.

Taxonomy and systematics
The alternate names "white-tailed lark" and "white-tailed bush-lark" should not be confused with the species of the same name, Mirafra albicauda. Other alternate names include monotonous bush lark and Southern white-tailed bush-lark.

Range 
The range of the monotonous lark is quite broad, extending over six countries: Angola, Botswana, Namibia, South Africa, Zambia, and Zimbabwe. Its global extent of occurrence is estimated at 1,400,000 km2.

Habitat 
Its natural habitats are dry savanna and subtropical or tropical dry lowland grassland.

References

External links 

 "Territory establishment and the mating system of the nomadic Monotonous Lark Mirafra passerina" by Derek Engelbrecht and Joe Grosel
 Monotonous lark - Species text in The Atlas of Southern African Birds.

monotonous lark
Birds of Southern Africa
monotonous lark
Taxonomy articles created by Polbot